Platinum & Gold Collection is a 2003 Ace of Base compilation album, released in the United States.  It has since been repackaged and sold as The Hits. It peaked at #16 on Billboard's Top Electronic Albums Chart on 16 October 2004.

Track listing
 "The Sign"
 "Cruel Summer" (Cutfather & Joe Mix)
 "Don't Turn Around"
 "Lucky Love" (Original Version)
 "All That She Wants"
 "Everytime It Rains" (Metro Radio Mix)
 "Whenever You're Near Me"
 "Living in Danger" (D-House Radio Mix)
 "Happy Nation" (Radio Edit)
 "Wheel of Fortune"
 "Never Gonna Say I'm Sorry"
 "Beautiful Life"

References

Ace of Base compilation albums
2003 greatest hits albums